The Nandi Award for Best Male Comedian the award was first given in 1985. Brahmanandam and M. S. Narayana have each won the award five times, and Suthi Velu won the award thrice.

References

Male Comedian